Para Para Sakura is a 2001 Hong Kong musical romantic comedy film directed by Jingle Ma, starring Aaron Kwok and Cecilia Cheung. The film was shot in Shanghai and Tokyo.

Cast
Aaron Kwok as Philip Wong (Sexy King)
Cecilia Cheung as Yuriko Sakurada
Ah Niu as Henry Ko
Tien Niu as Yamfeifei, Yuriko's Mother
Kazuhiko Nishimura	as Shunichi Kukukawa

Sources

http://au.rottentomatoes.com/m/para_para_sakura/about.php
https://movies.yahoo.com/movie/1807634811/details

2001 films
2001 romantic comedy-drama films
2000s musical comedy-drama films
Hong Kong romantic comedy-drama films
2000s dance films
2000s Cantonese-language films
Films directed by Jingle Ma
Golden Harvest films
Films set in Shanghai
Films shot in Shanghai
Films set in Tokyo
Films shot in Tokyo
Films with screenplays by Susan Chan
Hong Kong dance films
2000s romantic musical films
2001 comedy films
2001 drama films
2000s Hong Kong films